Lorenzo "Loren" Zúñiga Owono (born 18 January 2003) is a Spanish-born Equatoguinean professional footballer who plays as a striker for Málaga CF.

Early life
Zúñiga was born in Fuerteventura, Canary Islands to an Equatoguinean mother while his father, Lorenzo Zúñiga Ocaña, a footballer from Málaga, was then playing for CD Corralejo. He was raised in Málaga, after his father's retirement from playing.

Club career
Zúñiga joined Málaga CF's youth setup in 2012, aged nine, from Atlético Portada Alta. He made his senior debut with the reserves on 18 October 2020, starting in a 1–0 Tercera División home win against Juventud de Torremolinos CF.

On 23 February 2021, Zúñiga renewed his contract until 2024. He made his first team debut on 14 March, coming on as a second-half substitute for Caye Quintana in a 1–0 away win over UD Logroñés in the Segunda División.

References

External links

2003 births
Living people
People from Fuerteventura
Sportspeople from the Province of Las Palmas
People of Andalusian descent
Equatoguinean sportspeople of Spanish descent
Spanish sportspeople of Equatoguinean descent
Citizens of Equatorial Guinea through descent
Footballers from the Canary Islands
Spanish footballers
Equatoguinean footballers
Association football forwards
Segunda División players
Tercera División players
Tercera Federación players
Atlético Malagueño players
Málaga CF players
Spain youth international footballers